Symmes Chadwick Oliver (30 March 1928 – 9 August 1993) was an American anthropologist and science fiction and Western writer. He was born in Cincinnati, Ohio. His father was a surgeon and his mother a nurse. When he was young he suffered from rheumatic fever and as a result spent some time as an invalid, a time during which he became interested in science fiction. He spent most of his life in Austin, Texas where he was twice chairman of the Department of Anthropology of the University of Texas. He was also one of the founders of the Turkey City Writer's Workshop. He first attended the University in 1946 as a student and, apart from a brief sojourn to UCLA to obtain his Ph.D., he remained there in some capacity until his death, 47 years later.

He first had a story published in 1950. His science fiction is generally classified as anthropological science fiction because he often used insights from his professional work to inform his fictional writing.

An avid fly fisherman, Professor Oliver supported the Guadalupe River Chapter of Trout Unlimited and the cold water fishery downstream from Canyon Dam.  Numerous scenes in his writings made reference to actions and experiences related to fishing in moving water (e.g. wading a river in "Shores of Another Sea").

Bibliography

Novels 
 Mists of Dawn (1952)
 Shadows in the Sun (1954)
 The Winds of Time (1956)
 Unearthly Neighbors (1960, revised in 1984)
 The Wolf is My Brother (1967)
 The Shores of Another Sea (1971)
 Giants in the Dust (1976)
 Broken Eagle (1989)
 The Cannibal Owl (1994)

Collections 
 Another Kind (1955)
 The Edge of Forever (1971)
 A Star Above and Other Stories (2003)
 Far from This Earth and Other Stories (2003)

Selected short fiction
 "Transfusion" (1959)
 "Blood's a Rover" in Robert Silverberg (ed), Deep Space, 1976.  Not to be confused with a proposed novel of the same title by Harlan Ellison. 
 "The Shore of Tomorrow",  novelette in Startling Stories March, 1953

External links 

 
 A comprehensive bibliography of Chad Oliver, including two interviews.
 Biographical entry in The Encyclopedia of Science Fiction

References 

1928 births
1993 deaths
20th-century American novelists
American male novelists
American science fiction writers
Western (genre) writers
Novelists from Texas
American male short story writers
20th-century American short story writers
20th-century American male writers
20th-century American anthropologists